Gora Sovetskaya (meaning "Soviet Mountain"), also known as Berry Peak, is a mountain in Wrangel Island. Administratively it is part of the Chukotka Autonomous Okrug, Russian Federation.

It is located in the area near the center, in the Central Mountain Range that runs across Wrangel Island from east to west.

History
This mountain is conspicuous from the sea and was first described by Captain Thomas Long in 1867 as having "the appearance of an extinct volcano".
It was named "Berry Peak" by the United States Navy in 1881 after American Lieutenant Robert M. Berry, commander of the USS Rodgers, who led the group which landed on the island. As a result of the surveys of the time, Berry Peak was marked as a  mountain by the U.S. National Geodetic Survey. By early 20th century other surveys of the mountain had been carried out from the shore, but once inland it was not clear which mountain was "Berry Peak". 

The mountain was properly surveyed in 1938, during the time of the USSR, when the island had already become part of Russia. The correct elevation was found to be  and the peak was named "Gora Sovetskaya".

See also
List of mountains in Russia
List of islands by highest point
Topographic isolation

References

External links
Skrylnik G.P. – Climomorphogenesis and stability of geosystems of Wrangel Island // Arctic and Antarctic. – 2019.- No. 3. – S. 1 – 15. DOI: 10.7256 / 2453–8922.2019.3.29896 (in Russian)

Sovietskaya
Wrangel Island
Mountains of Chukotka Autonomous Okrug